The God and the Demons of Zu Mountain is a Hong Kong television series. It was first run on TVB in 1990. 
A following loose sequel The Zu Mountain Saga was released in 1991.

Synopsis
The Good triumphs over evil. This is the story of the two sides, battling for supremacy. Under the fighting, there is romance, and angst.

Cast
Main Characters
Eddie Kwan - Sheung Guan Ging Er (Current eldest male disciple of the Zu Mountain Sect) → Blood Demon 
Aaron Kwok - Yim Gum Sim (Current second eldest male disciple of the Zu Mountain Sect)
Pauline Yeung - Li Zi King  (New disciple of the Zu Mountain Sect), Love Interest of Sheung Guan Ging Er
Anita Lee (Yuan Wah) - Zhou Qing Wan (disciple of the Wong Mountain) 
Mimi Kung - Sa Yim Hong (leader of the Zodiac Sect)

Supporting Characters 
 Jimmy Au - Au Yeung Ping - Former member of the demon sect
Lau Kong - Master Miu Yi (Sect Leader of the Zu Mountain Sect)
 Ng Sui Ting - Laughing Monk
 Chu Tik Wor - Green Robe Devil - Leader of the demon sect
 Danny Summer (Ha Siu Sing) - Ding Yin (Blood Demon). Former disciple of previous generation of Zu Mountain Sect. Attempted to absorb  Blood Demonic power to become more powerful by taking evil ways which he succeed in his second attempt.
 Wong Yi Kum - Yim Ling Wan (Current eldest female disciple of the Zu Mountain Sect)
 Lau Sau Ping - Qing Han Shang - The oldest of the two Qing sisters.
 Chan Pui San - Qing Han Org - the youngest of the two Qing sisters. Love Interest of  Yim Gum Sim
 Chan Ha - mistress (leader of the Wong Mountain). Mentor of Zhou Qing Wan

1990 Hong Kong television series debuts
TVB dramas
Hong Kong wuxia television series
1990 Hong Kong television series endings
Cantonese-language television shows
Television shows set in Sichuan